Ceper Station (CE) is a class II railway station located in Klepu, Ceper, Klaten Regency; at an altitude of +133 meters, including in the Operational Area VI Yogyakarta.

Since the operation of the Yogyakarta–Solo double tracks – segment in 2001 and completed on the – segment on 15 December 2003, this station has five railway tracks with lines 2 and 3 being straight lines and line 5 as parking for freight trains.

To support the double tracks operation, the mechanical signaling system at this station was replaced with an electric signaling system made by PT Len Industri which had been installed since 2013 and then began operating on 12 February 2019.

To the west of this station, before Klaten Station, there is Ketandan Station which has been inactive since the Kutoarjo–Solo double tracks operates. In addition, from this station there is a branching line to the Ceper Baru sugar factory now been deactivated.

Starting 10 February 2021, to coincide with the launch of the 2021 train travel chart, this station together with three other stations (Delanggu Station, Gawok Station, and Srowot Station) began serving KRL Commuterline across Yogyakarta–Solo Balapan.

Services
The following is a list of train services at the Ceper Station.
KRL Commuterline 

References 

Klaten Regency
Railway stations in Central Java
railway stations opened in 1871